Qualification for the 2003 FIBA European Championship, commonly called FIBA EuroBasket 2003 took place between 17 May 2000 and 25 January 2003. A total of fourteen teams qualified for the tournament. Sweden and Serbia and Montenegro qualified directly as hosts and EuroBasket 2001 Champions respectively.

Format
Competition consisted of three stages:

A preliminary round that consisted of six teams that competed in a round-robin tournament that took place in Vejle, Denmark between 17 May and 25 May 2000. The top two teams advanced to the semi-final round.
A qualifying round where the third through sixth teams from the preliminary round joined another ten teams. The sixteen teams were divided into four round-robin groups of four teams each. Each group competition consisted of home and away legs, taking place in each of the participating countries. The top two teams from each group advanced to the semi-final round.
A Semi-Final round where the teams that advanced through the preliminary and qualifying rounds joined another twenty teams. All thirty teams where then divided in five round-robin groups of six teams each. This stage took place between 21 November 2001 and 25 January 2003 and competition consisted of home and away legs, taking place in each of the participating countries. The top two teams from each group plus the four best third-placed teams qualified for EuroBasket 2003.

Preliminary round

|}
Rules=1) Points; 2) Head-to-head results; 3) Points difference; 4) Points scored.

Qualifying round

Group 1

Group 2

Group 3

Rules=1) Points; 2) Head-to-head results; 3) Points difference; 4) Points scored.

Group 4

Semi-final round

Group A

Rules=1) Points; 2) Head-to-head results; 3) Points difference; 4) Points scored.

Group B

Rules=1) Points; 2) Head-to-head results; 3) Points difference; 4) Points scored.

Group C

Group D

Rules=1) Points; 2) Head-to-head results; 3) Points difference; 4) Points scored.

Group E

References

qualification
1999–2000 in European basketball
2000–01 in European basketball
2001–02 in European basketball
2002–03 in European basketball
2003